The 1986 season was the sixth in the history of Wollongong City (now Wollongong Wolves). It was also the sixth season in the National Soccer League. In addition to the domestic league, they also participated in the NSL Cup. Wollongong City finished 8th to be relegated in their National Soccer League season, and were eliminated in the NSL Cup second round by Sydney Olympic.

Players

Competitions

Overview

National Soccer League

League table

Results by round

Matches

NSL Cup

Statistics

Appearances and goals
Players with no appearances not included in the list.

Clean sheets

References

Wollongong Wolves FC seasons